Almaleea is a genus of perennial shrubs from the legume family Fabaceae native to Australia.

Species
Almaleea comprises the following species:
 Almaleea cambagei (Maiden & Betche) Crisp & P.H. Weston
 Almaleea capitata (J.H.Willis) Crisp & P.H.Weston
 Almaleea incurvata (A.Cunn.) Crisp & P.H.Weston
 Almaleea paludosa (J.Thompson) Crisp & P.H.Weston
 Almaleea subumbellata (Hook.) Crisp & P.H.Weston

References

Mirbelioids
Fabales of Australia
Taxa named by Michael Crisp
Fabaceae genera